Antonio Cando Halili (February 8, 1946 – July 2, 2018) was a Filipino politician who served as the Mayor of Tanauan, Batangas from 2013 until his death in 2018. His term as mayor was controversial due to his methods of dealing with crime and illegal drugs in the city. On July 2, 2018, he was assassinated, dying  after being shot through the chest by an unknown gunman.

Business career
Prior to pursuing a political career, Antonio Halili was a businessman. He established ANC Halili Group of Companies (ANC HGC), a fully Filipino-owned conglomerate with subsidiaries participating involved in the real estate, information technology, and private emission and drug industries. ANC HGC runs 60 emission testing centers in Luzon alone.

Political career

Mayor of Tanauan
Halili became mayor of Tanauan, a city in the province of Batangas in the Philippines, in 2013. During his term as Mayor, he gained notoriety for his treatment of suspected criminals, namely those involved in drug-related crimes. In 2016, Halili became the center of newfound attention after he ordered drug suspects to be paraded around the city, in a campaign that was dubbed the ‘walk of shame’. Suspected criminals were forced to wear cardboard signs that read, “I'm a pusher, don't emulate me”. His campaign was criticized by human rights groups and other politicians. Later on in his term, Halili himself would be accused of having drug related ties, an accusation he denied. In October 2017, he had his supervisory powers over the local police stripped from him.

Assassination

On July 2, 2018, Halili was shot by an unidentified sniper during a flag raising ceremony at the Tanauan City Hall. The bullet hit a mobile phone in Halili's pocket and pierced his chest. Halili's bodyguards fired back towards a hill where the bullet appeared to have come from. The police searched the hill but failed to find anyone. Bystanders were shocked, and began panicking and taking cover. 

Halili was driven to the Reyes Memorial Hospital and was declared dead less than an hour after the bullet was fired. Philippine National Police Chief Director General Oscar Albayalde said that a regional special task group had been convened to investigate the killing, and was considering the suspect parades a motive. One day later, another Philippine mayor, Ferdinand Bote of General Tinio, Nueva Ecija, was also shot dead, by a sniper.

References

1946 births
2018 deaths
Assassinated Filipino politicians
Deaths by firearm in the Philippines
People murdered in the Philippines
Mayors of places in Batangas
People from Tanauan, Batangas
People of the Philippine Drug War
20th-century Filipino businesspeople
Assassinated mayors